Betsie Valley Trail is a  rail trail in Benzie County, Michigan, United States, owned by the Michigan Department of Natural Resources and operated by Benzie County.

It is on the trackbed of a former Ann Arbor Railroad line and extends from Frankfort to Thompsonville, via Elberta and Beulah.

References

External links 

 

Protected areas of Benzie County, Michigan
Rail trails in Michigan